The Prince and the Pauper is a 1972 Soviet drama film directed by Vadim Gauzner.

Plot 
The young thief Tom wants to thank the man who paid the ransom for him to the bandits and for this goes to the palace. On the way, he meets Prince Edward, who looks just like him, and they decide to swap roles.

Cast 
 Viktor Smirnov as Edward VI/Tom Canty
 Yuri Astafyev as Hemphrey
 Ivan Krasko as Miles Hendon
 Maya Bulgakova as Jenny, Tom's mother
 Aleksandr Sokolov as John Canty, Tom's father
 Marina Neyolova as Elizabeth I
 Anatoly Solonitsyn as Lord Saint John
 Gennadi Poloka as Edward Seymour
 Rolan Bykov as Sir William, master of ceremonies
 Oleg Borisov as Hugo

References

External links 
 

1972 films
1970s Russian-language films
Soviet drama films
1972 drama films